Sikh ( or ;) is the title and name given to an adherent of Sikhism.

Academia

Deep Saini, Vice Chancellor at McGill University

Biology
Baldev Singh Dhillon
Gurcharan Singh Kalkat
Kartar Singh Thind
Khem Singh Gill
Mohinder Singh Randhawa
Narinder Singh Randhawa
Sardul Singh Guraya

Economics
Manmohan Singh
Sucha Singh Gill

Medicine
Baldev Singh
Daljit Singh

 David Shannahoff-Khalsa, prolific researcher on the psychiatric applications of Kundalini Yoga based at the Biocircuits Institute at the University of California, San Diego.
Gagandeep Kang
Jaswant Singh Neki
Harpal Kumar, Chief Executive of Cancer Research UK
 Harminder Dua, discovered a previously unknown layer lurking in the human eye named the "dua's layer".
Harpinder Singh Chawla
 Harvinder Sahota, cardiologist; invented the FDA-approved Perfusion Balloon Angioplasty and holds patents of 24 other medical inventions.
Jasbir Singh Bajaj
Khem Singh Grewal
Khushdeva Singh
Kirpal Singh Chugh
M. M. S. Ahuja
Prithipal Singh Maini
Sahib Singh Sokhey
 Sat Bir Singh Khalsa, Harvard University-based researcher of Kundalini Yoga and an authority on the field of yoga research.
Tarlochan Singh Kler

Physics
Manjit Singh (armament scientist)
 Narinder Singh Kapany, physicist, specializing in fiber optics. He was named as one of the seven "Unsung Heroes" by Fortune Magazine in its Businessmen of the Century (November 22, 1999) edition.
Piara Singh Gill

Architects
Ram Singh, one of pre-partition Punjab's foremost architects

Artists

Actors

Punjabi Cinema

 Ammy Virk
 Amrinder Gill
 Anurag Singh
 Babbu Maan
 Baljit Singh Deo
 Binnu Dhillon
 Diljit Dosanjh
 Gippy Grewal
 Gugu Gill
 Gurdaas Maan
 Gurpreet Ghuggi
 Harbhajan Mann
 Harry Baweja
 Jaspal Bhatti
 Jaswinder Bhalla
 Jimmy Shergill
 Kulraj Randhawa
 Mahi Gill
 Mandy Takhar
 Neeru Bajwa
 Rana Ranbir
 Shavinder Mahal
 Sidhu Moosewala
 Simran Kaur Mundi
 Smeep Kang
 Sonam Bajwa
 Sonia Anand
 Surveen Chawla
 Yograj Singh
Yuvraj Hans

Bollywood

[[Diljit 
Sunny Deol

Bobby Deol
Gippy Grewal
Honey Singh
Manjot Singh
Minissha Lamba
Navneet Kaur Dhillon

Geeta Bali
Gracy Singh
Gulzar
Guru Randhawa 
Jagjit Singh
Jaspal Bhatti
Jesse Randhawa
Jimmy Shergill
Joginder
Kabir Bedi
Kanwaljit Singh
Kuldip Kaur
Kulraj Randhawa
Mangal Dhillon
Manjot Singh
Neetu Singh
Neha Dhupia
Poonam Dhillon
Priya Gill
Priya Rajvansh

[[Simi 

Swaran Lata
[[Taapsee 
Yogeeta Bali
Parmeet Sethi

Telugu Cinema

Rakul Preet Singh
Charmy Kaur
Mehreen Pirzada
Taapsee Pannu

American

Kulvinder Ghir

Parminder Nagra
Satinder Sartaj

Tarsem Singh

Kabir Bedi

 Alexandra Aitken (Uttrang Kaur Khalsa) – Environmental campaigner, model, actress, artist and socialite
 Ameet Chana – Actor
 Amrit Maghera – Professional model turned actress
 Chandeep Uppal – Critically acclaimed starring role as Meena Kumar in the film Anita and Me.
 Jassa Ahluwalia – Actor and presenter
 Lena Kaur – Best known for her role as Leila Roy in Channel 4's Hollyoaks 
 Simon Rivers – English actor who played the role of Kevin Tyler in Doctors
 Stephen Uppal – Known for playing Ravi Roy in the long-running British soap Hollyoaks
 Mandip Gill – Actress

Pornography
Sunny Leone

Comedians

 Paul Chowdhry – Comedian and actor
Lilly Singh
Jus Reign
Jaspal Bhatti

Directors

Dhar Mann
Gurinder Chadha
Param Gill
 Perry Bhandal – Film director, screenwriter
Namrata Singh Gujral

Fashion
 Amarjot Kaur
 Harnaaz Kaur Sandhu, Punjabi beauty pageant titleholder and model who was crowned Miss Universe 2021

 Hasleen Kaur
 Jesse Randhawa, Bollywood model
 Kuljeet Randhawa
 Mahek Chahal
 Mandira Bedi
 Navneet Kaur Dhillon
 Neha Kapur
 Neelam Gill, Burberry 
 Gurleen Chopra, model
 Simran Kaur Mundi
 Sonampreet Bajwa
Waris Ahluwalia

Musicians

Hindi music
 Arijit Singh
 Asees Kaur 
 Daler Mehndi
 Diljit Dosanjh
 Guru Randhawa
Hans Raj Hans
 Harrdy Sandhu
Harshdeep Kaur
 Honey Singh
 Jagjit Singh
 Mika Singh
 Neha Kakkar
 Sukhwinder Singh

Punjabi music
 AP Dhillon
 Amrinder Gill
 Babbu Mann
 Bhupinder Singh
 Roshan Prince
 Diljit Dosanjh
 Garry Sandhu
 Gippy Grewal
 Gurinder Gill
 Gurnam Bhullar
 Guru Randhawa
 Hard Kaur
 Hardy Sandhu

 Honey Singh
 Jass Manak
 Jassi Gill
 Jasmine Sandlas
 Jaspinder Narula
 Jazzy B
 Karan Aujla
 Kanth Kaler

 Labh Janjua

 Narinder Biba
 Nimrat Khaira
 Miss Pooja
 Satinder Sartaaj
 Shailendra Singh
 Shehnaz Gill
 Sidhu Moose Wala
 Taz
B21 (Bally and Bhota Jagpal)
Bally Sagoo
Jaz Dhami 
Bobby Friction
Dr. Zeus
Tarsem Jassar
Hard Kaur
Prem Dhillon
Jas Mann (with Babylon Zoo)
Juggy D
Navtej Singh Rehal of Bombay Rockers
Panjabi MC
Rishi Rich
Sahotas
Sukhbir
Taz
Amar Singh Chamkila
Apna Sangeet
Asa Singh Mastana
Balkar Sidhu
Gurdas Mann
 Harbhajan Mann
Jagmeet Bal
Kamal Heer
Kuldeep Manak
Lal Chand Yamla Jatt
Lehmber Hussainpuri
Malkit Singh
Manmohan Waris
Rabbi Shergill
Ravinder Grewal
Sangtar
Snatam Kaur
Surinder Kaur
Surinder Shinda
Surjit Bindrakhia
Uttam Singh

English music

Jay Sean
NAV (rapper)

Visual arts
Amrita Sher-Gil
Aman Singh Gulati
Sobha Singh
S. G. Thakur Singh
Sohan Singh

Writers
Ranj Dhaliwal
Harbans Singh
Jodh Singh
Rattan Singh Bhangu
Max Arthur Macauliffe
Khushwant Singh
Tavleen Singh
Sathnam Sanghera
Jagjit Singh Dardi (Punjab Rattan)

Punjabi, Hindi and Urdu
Rajkavi Inderjeet Singh Tulsi
Bhai Gurdas
Nanak Singh
Bhai Kahn Singh Nabha
Bhai Vir Singh
Rajinder Singh Bedi
Jaswant Neki
Rupinderpal Singh Dhillon
Harbhajan Singh
Harcharan Singh (playwright)
Jaswant Singh Kanwal
Amrita Pritam
Dalip Kaur Tiwana
Kulwant Singh Virk
Sahib Singh
Pritam Saini

English

Rupi Kaur
Bali Rai
Jaspreet Singh
Khushwant Singh
Dayal Kaur Khalsa
Ranj Dhaliwal
Shauna Singh Baldwin
Indu Banga
Upinder Singh

Athletes

Running

Milkha Singh, 
Ranjit Bhatia
Gurbachan Singh Randhawa
Kamaljeet Sandhu
Fauja Singh, a centenarian marathon runner

Basketball
Nav Bhatia, businessman, First Sikh with NBA Championship Ring 
Sim Bhullar, Canadian professional basketball player
Satnam Singh Bhamara

Boxing
Andrew Singh Kooner - Former Bantamweight Champion of Canada
Akaash Bhatia - British featherweight professional boxer
Sukhdeep Singh Chakria - Canadian Middleweight Boxer

Cycling
Alexi Grewal, Olympic Gold medalist (1984 Summer Olympics in Los Angeles)

Cricket
Amar Virdi - Cricketer for Surrey County Cricket Club
Anureet Singh
Arshdeep Singh - Cricketer for India's National Team
Balwinder Sandhu
Bhupinder Singh, Sr.
Bishan Singh Bedi Former Cricketer & Captain for India's National Team
Jasprit Bumrah
Gurkeerat Singh Mann
Gursharan Singh
Harbhajan Singh
Tanveer Sangha, member of Australia cricket team
Gurinder Sandhu, member of Australia cricket team
Harvinder Singh
Ish Sodhi, member of New Zealand cricket team
Simi Singh - Cricketer for Ireland National Team
Mandeep Singh
Maninder Singh
Manpreet Gony
Monty Panesar Former Cricketer for England's National Team member of English cricket team
Navjot Singh Sidhu - Former Cricketer for India's National Team
Ravi Bopara, member of English cricket team
Reetinder Sodhi
Sarandeep Singh
Simranjit Singh
Sunny Sohal
Vikramjit Singh - Cricketer for Netherlands National Team
V. R. V. Singh
Yograj Singh
Yuvraj Singh - Former Cricketer for India's National Team

Equestrian
Amarinder Singh

Football
Ashvir Johal - Former first team coach at Wigan Athletic
Manprit Sarkaria - Footballer for SK Sturm Graz in Austrian Football Bundesliga. He was named in the Team of the Year for 2021-2022 Austrian Bundesliga Season
Shaan Hundal - Footballer for Inter Miami
Brandon Singh Khela - Footballer for Birmingham City Under 18
Yan Dhanda - Footballer for Ross County F.C.
Kamran Kandola - Footballer for Wolverhampton Wanderers Under 21
Kabir Chahal - Footballer for Kilmarnock F.C.
Rikki Bains - Footballer for Bedworth United
Danny Batth - Footballer for Sunderland A.F.C.. Previously played for Wolverhampton Wanderers, Stoke City, Middlesbrough F.C..
Mal Benning - Footballer for Port Vale F.C.
Gurdev Singh Gill - Former Footballer for India national football team
Arjan Raikhy - Footballer for Aston Villa
Harpal Singh - Former Footballer for Leeds United
Harmeet Singh - Former Norwegian International Footballer
Inder Singh - Former Footballer for JCT FC
Roger Verdi - Former North American Soccer League Footballer
Jazz Juttla - Former Footballer for Greenock Morton F.C.
Jarnail Singh - Former English Football League Referee. 
Bhupinder Singh Gill - Premier League Football Assistant Referee
Sunny Singh Gill - English Football League Referee

Golf
Jyoti Randhawa
Arjun Atwal
Gaganjeet Bhullar
Ashbeer Saini
Jeev Milkha Singh

Hockey

Balbir Singh Dosanjh
Harmanpreet Singh 
Ravi Kahlon
Ajit Pal Singh
Baljeet Singh Saini
Baljit Singh Dhillon
Balwant (Bal) Singh Saini
Gagan Ajit Singh
Garewal Singh
Gurdev Singh Kullar (field hockey)
Jujhar Khaira
Kulbir Bhaura
Pargat Singh
Prabhjot Singh
Prithipal Singh
Ramandeep Singh
Surjit Singh Randhawa
Sardar Singh
Sandeep Singh

Mixed martial arts
Kultar Gill

Muay Thai
Kash Gill

Powerlifting
Rajinder Singh Rahelu, Sikh paralympian and also 2004 Athens bronze medalist

Rally
Karamjit Singh, PRWC champion 2002, Asia Pacific Rally Championship champion 2001. A Malaysian known as the "Flying Sikh"

Rugby
Tosh Masson

Shooting
Abhinav Bindra Olympic gold medalist in shooting
Avneet Sidhu, Commonwealth Games medalist in shooting
Manavjit Singh Sandhu, world champion in shooting
Heena Sidhu, world champion in shooting

Swimming
Pamela Rai, 1984 Olympic bronze medalist, 1986 Commonwealth Games gold medalist

Wrestling
Dara Singh - Former Wrestler and Inducted in WWE Legacy Class in 2018. 
Tiger Joginder Singh
Randhawa
Tiger Jeet Singh
Dilsher Shanky - WWE Wrestler 
Jinder Mahal - WWE Wrestler and former holder of the WWE Championship.
Gurjit Singh - Former WWE Wrestler. 
Ranjin Singh
Gadowar Singh Sahota
Arjan Bhullar
Tiger Ali Singh
Raj Singh (wrestler) - Former Impact Wrestling Wrestler.

Business

Ajay Banga, President/COO, MasterCard; ex-CEO- Citi Group-Asia Pacific
Analjit Singh, founder/chairman, Max India Limited; chair, Max New York Life Insurance Company Ltd; Max Healthcare Institute Ltd and Max Bupa Health Insurance Company Ltd
 Avtar Lit, founder of Sunrise Radio
 Avtar Saini, microprocessor designer and former vice president of Intel
Bob Singh Dhillon, founder/CEO, Mainstreet Equity Corp.
Dyal Singh Majithia, Indian banker
Gurbachan Singh Dhingra, owner of Berger Paints India
Gurbaksh Chahal, entrepreneur who founded several internet advertising companies
H. S. Bedi (entrepreneur), telecom
Jasminder Singh, British businessman
Jessie Singh Saini, founder of BJS Electronics and American industrialist of Indian descent.
Kamel Hothi, former banker at Lloyds Bank
 Kanwal Rekhi, one of the first Indian entrepreneurs in Silicon Valley
Kuldip Singh Dhingra, owner of Berger Paints India
Kushal Pal Singh, Chairman and CEO of DLF
Malvinder Mohan Singh, Ranbaxy/Fortis Group
Mohan Singh Oberoi
M. S. Banga, ex-CEO, Hindustan Lever
Param Singh (property developer), property developer, entrepreneur
Sanjiv Sidhu, Founder and President of i2 Technologies, richest Indian on Earth in 2000
Sant Singh Chatwal, owner of the Bombay Palace chain of restaurants and Hampshire Hotels & Resorts
Satwant Singh, Le Meridien Hotel, DSS Enterprises, Pure Drink
Shivinder Mohan Singh, Ranbaxy/Fortis Group
Tom Singh, founder, New Look (Fashion chain)
Trishneet Arora, author 
Vikram Chatwal, hotelier

Crime
Bindy Johal
Lawrence Bishnoi
Punjabi-Canadian organized crime

Humanitarians
Bhagat Puran Singh, founder of Pingalwara, Home of Disabled, Amritsar
Bhai Trilochan Singh Panesar, devoted his life to sewa (service to community and God) and simran (remembrance of God), the two tenets of Sikh life.
Ravi Singh, CEO, Khalsa Aid
 Alex Sangha, social worker and documentary film producer and Founder of Sher Vancouver

Military

Indian Army
 General Joginder Jaswant Singh, former Chief of Army Staff of Indian Army.
 General Bikram Singh, former Chief of Army Staff of Indian Army.
 Lieutenant General Bikram Singh, GOC XV Corps, 1960–63
 Lieutenant General Joginder Singh Dhillon
 Lieutenant General Jagjit Singh Aurora

Indian Navy
 Admiral Karambir Singh
 Vice Admiral Surinder Pal Singh Cheema

Indian Air Force
 Marshal of the Indian Air Force Arjan Singh, former Chief of the Air Staff, Indian Air Force.
 Air Chief Marshal Dilbagh Singh, former Chief, Indian Air Force.
Air Chief Marshal Birender Singh Dhanoa, former chief, Indian Air Force.
Harjit Singh Arora
Trilochan Singh Brar
Kulwant Singh Gill
Jasjit Singh
Jagjeet Singh
Flying Officer Nirmal Jit Singh Sekhon, PVC

Singaporean Army and Navy
 General Ravinder Singh
 Pritam Singh
Colonel Gurcharan Singh Sekhon

Sikhs In US Military
 Bhagat Singh Thind
 Uday Singh Taunque

Khalistani militants
 Saint Jarnail Singh Khalsa Bhindranwale
 Baba Gurbachan Singh Manochahal
 Bhai Gurjant Singh Budhsinghwala
 Talwindar Singh Babbar
 Bhai Sukhdev Singh Babbar
 Bhai Jugraj Singh Toofan
 Maj Gen Shahbeg Singh
 Bhai Amrik Singh

Military Gallantry Award Winners

British Indian Army

Victoria Cross
Ishar Singh, first Sikh to receive the Victoria Cross
Nand Singh
Gian Singh
Parkash Singh
Karamjeet Singh Judge

Indian Armed Forces

Param Veer Chakra
Nirmal Jit Singh Sekhon, only Indian Air Force officer to be awarded Param Vir Chakra
Subedar Bana Singh
Karam Singh
Joginder Singh Sahnan

Mahavir Chakra
Dewan Ranjit Rai, first Indian to receive Mahavir Chakra 
Brigadier Rajinder Singh
Rajinder Singh Sparrow
Sant Singh
Ranjit Singh Dyal
Brigadier Kuldip Singh Chandpuri, known for his heroic leadership in the famous Battle of Longewala
Major General Kulwant Singh Pannu

Monarchs

Sikh nationalist leaders

 Baba Banda Singh Bahadur was a commander of Khalsa army
 Jassa Singh Ahluwalia was a Sikh leader of During Sikh Confederacy and ruler of Ahluwalia Misl
 Jassa Singh Ramgarhia was a Sikh leader during the period of Sikh Confederacy and founder of Ramgarhia Misl
 Baba Deep Singh was one of the most hallowed martyrs in the history of Sikhs, he was also a founder of Shaheedan Misl
 Charat Singh was the father of Mahan Singh, and the grandfather of Ranjit Singh; he was the founder of Sukerchakia Misl
 Nawab Kapur Singh was the oraganizer of Sikh Confederacy and Dal Khalsa, He was also a Founder of Singhpuria Misl
 Akali Phula Singh was an Akali Nihang leader
 Maharaja Ranjit Singh was a founder of Sikh Empire
 Baba Binod Singh was the first jathedar of Buddha Dal

 Nawab Kapur Singh was the organizer of Sikh Confederacy and the Dal Khalsa. He was also a founder of Singhpuria Misl
 Sardar Jassa Singh Ahluwalia, was a supreme leader of Dal Khalsa. He was also misldar of Ahluwalia Misl.He founded the Kapurthala state in 1772.
 Maharaja Ranjit Singh, Popularly known as Sher-e-Punjab was a founder of the Sikh Empire. He was also a Misldar of Sukerchakia Misl
 Maharaja Kharak Singh, second emperor of the Sikh Empire
 Maharaja Nau Nihal Singh, third emperor of the Sikh Empire.
 Maharaja Sher Singh, was the fourth maharaja of the Sikh Empire.
 Maharaja Duleep Singh was the last Emperor of the Sikh Empire
 Ala Singh. was the first king of princely state of Patiala State

Misl Period Notable Rulers 

 Jassa Singh Ramgarhia, founder of Ramgarhia Misl
 Jodh Singh Ramgarhia, second ruler of the Ramgarhia Misl
 Phul Singh Sidhu, founder of the Phulkian Misl
 Hari Singh Dhillon, ruler of Bhangi Misl, one of the most powerful rulers of Punjab during Misl period
 Bhuma Singh Dhillon, ruler of Bhangi Misl
 Heera Singh Sandhu, founder of Nakai Misl
 Ran Singh Sandhu, third ruler of Nakai Misl
 Karmo Kaur Sandhu, regent of Nakai Misl 
 Datar Kaur Sandhu, princess of Nakai Misl
 Kahan Singh Nakai was the last ruler of the Nakai Misl 
 Jai Singh Sandhu was the founder of Kanhaiya Misl
 Gurbaksh Singh Kanhaiya was second chief of Kanhaiya Misl.  He was the eldest son of Jai Singh Kanhaiya And the father of Maharani Mehtab Kaur
 Sada Kaur Dhaliwal was the chief of Kanhaiya Misl and the mother-in-law of Maharaja Ranjit Singh
 Baghel Singh Dhaliwal, ruler of the Singh Krora Misl
 Gulab Singh Rathore was the founder of Dallewalia Misl
 Charat Singh was the father of Maha Singh and the grandfather of Ranjit Singh. He was the founder of Sukerchakia Misl
 Desan Kaur Warrach, regent of Sukerchakia Misl
 Maha Singh was second chief of Sukerchakia Misl. He was the eldest son of Charat Singh. He was the father of Ranjit Singh
 Raj Kaur Sidhu, regent of Sukerchakia Misl

Titular Ruler

 Maharaja Bhupinder Singh
 Raghubir Singh Jind
 Hira Singh Nabha
 Yadavindra Singh

Politicians

Indian revolutionaries and freedom fighters
Bhai Randhir Singh
Baba Gurdit Singh
Baba Gurmukh Singh
Baldev Singh 
Bhagat Singh, also known as "Shaheed-e-Azam", was a charismatic Indian socialist revolutionary whose acts of dramatic violence against the British in India and execution at age 23 made him a folk hero of the Indian independence movement
Captain Mohan Singh
Gurdan Saini
Kartar Singh Sarabha, Indian Sikh revolutionary and the most active member of the Ghadar Party
Labh Singh Saini
Teja Singh Samundri
Udham Singh
Harnam Singh Saini
Sardul Singh Kavishar
Sardar Ajit Singh, was an Indian revolutionary, he was the uncle of sardar Bhagat Singh
Dharam Singh Hayatpur was an Indian revolutionary, he was a prominent member of the Sikh political and religious group the Babbar Akali Movement in India
Kartar Singh Jhabbar, was an Indian revolutionary, he was a Sikh leader known for his role in the Gurdwara Reform Movement of the 1920s
Ripudaman Singh, Indian revolutionary
Baba Kharak Singh
Bhai Balmukund was an Indian revolutionary freedom fighter
Ram Singh, credited as being the first Indian to use non-cooperation and boycott of British merchandise and services as a political weapon.
Kishan Singh Gargaj
Sohan Singh Bhakna, was an Indian revolutionary, the founding president of the Ghadar Party
Sohan Singh Josh, was an Indian communist activist and freedom fighter
Diwan Mulraj Chopra
Gulab Kaur
Sunder Singh Lyallpuri, was a General of Akali Movement
Maya Singh Saini
Jagbir Singh Chhina
Sadhu Singh Hamdard, well-known freedom fighter and the journalist of Punjab
Darshan Singh Pheruman, Indian freedom fighter, Sikh activist and politician
Jaswant Singh Rahi
Giani Ditt Singh
Ganda Singh, was a prominent member of the Ghadar Party
Teja Singh Swatantar

Canada

 Gurbax Singh Malhi – former Liberal MP
 Amrit Mangat – Liberal MPP, Brampton
 Gulzar Singh Cheema – Manitoba and British Columbia Former MLA
 Gurmant Grewal – former Conservative MP, half (with Nina, listed below)
 Manmeet Singh Bhullar – former Progressive Conservative MLA, Calgary-Greenway, Alberta
 Hardial Bains – founder and leader of the Marxist–Leninist Party of Canada from 1970–1997
 Harinder Takhar – Ontario Liberal MPP and Minister of Transportation
 Harry Bains – British Columbia New Democratic
 Herb Dhaliwal – former Liberal MP and the first Indo-Canadian cabinet minister

 Jagmeet Singh – Ontario NDP MPP / leader of the Federal New Democratic Party
 Vic Dhillon – Ontario Liberal MPP
 Harjit Sajjan – Liberal MP, Vancouver South and Minister of National Defence (Canada)

 Navdeep Bains – Liberal MP, Minister of Education and Science
 Amarjeet Sohi – Liberal MP, Minister of Infrastructure and Communities
 Bardish Chagger – Liberal MP, Minister of Small Business and Tourism and leader of the Government in the House of Commons
 Ujjal Dosanjh – former Premier of British Columbia, former MPP, former federal Minister of Health
 Prab Gill – MLA, Calgary-Greenway, Alberta

Pakistan

 Mahindar Pall Singh, Sikh MPA, politician and Business man from Multan

Fiji
Ujagar Singh Elected to the Legislative Council of Fiji in the 1968, representing the National Federation Party (NFP). He was also a member of independent Fiji's House of Representatives.

India

Amarinder Singh.former chief minister of Punjab
Baldev Singh
Bhagwant Maan.Current chief Minister of Punjab
Buta Singh 
Charanjit Singh Channi
Darbara Singh
Giani Zail Singh

Gurcharan Singh Tohra
Gurdial Singh Dhillon
Harkishan Singh Surjeet
Harsimrat Kaur Badal
Manmohan Singh,

Master Tara Singh
Montek Singh Ahluwalia, Deputy Chairman, Planning commission of India
Navjot Singh Sidhu
Nirmal Singh Kahlon
Parkash Singh Badal
Pratap Singh Bajwa
Pratap Singh Kairon
Preneet Kaur Kahlon
Rajinder Kaur Bhattal
Sant Fateh Singh
Sardar Ujjal Singh, former Governor of Punjab and Tamil Nadu
Sardul Singh Caveeshar
Simranjit Singh Mann
Sukhbir Singh Badal 
Sukhjinder Singh Randhawa
Surinder Singh Bajwa
Surjit Singh Barnala
Swaran Singh
Varinder Singh Bajwa

Malaysia
Gobind Singh Deo – Democratic Action Party Central Executive Committee, Current Member of Parliament, Minister of Communications and Multimedia
Karpal Singh – Chairman of DAP. Member of parliament (aka "Tiger of Jelutong")

Mauritius
Kher Jagatsingh – Minister of Education and Minister of Planning & Economic Development (1967-1982)

New Zealand
Kanwal Singh Bakshi, Member of Parliament from 2008 (first Indian and first Sikh MP in New Zealand)
Sukhi Turner, Mayor of Dunedin 1995-2005

Philippines

Ramon Bagatsing

Singapore

Pritam Singh

United Kingdom

 Parmjit Dhanda, former Labour MP
 Tan Dhesi, Labour MP
 Preet Gill, Labour MP
 Indarjit Singh, non-party 
 Marsha Singh, former Labour MP
 Parmjit Singh Gill, Liberal Democrats
 Paul Uppal, former Conservative MP

United States

Ravinder Bhalla, New Jersey politician and Hoboken mayor elect
Preet Bharara (born 1968), former U. S. attorney
Harmeet Dhillon, Republican Party official in San Francisco
Preet Didbal, First Sikh Mayor in the United States. Mayor of Yuba City, CA
Kashmir Gill, banker and former mayor

Gurbir Grewal, 61st Attorney General of New Jersey
Martin Hoke (born 1952), Republican politician
Dalip Singh Saund (1899–1973), Democrat politician

G. B. Singh, periodontist and retired army officer
Bhagat Singh Thind (Bhagat Singh Thind (1892–1967) writer, scientist, and lecturer on spirituality, involved in legal battle over the rights of Indians to obtain U.S. citizenship
Uday Singh Taunque (1982–2003) soldier, KIA, bronze star recipient

Religious figures

Historical importance to Sikh religion
Bhai Mardana (1459–1534) was Guru Nanak Dev's companion on all of his Udasis (travels) and he played kirtan.
Bebe Nanaki (1464–1518) is known as the first Sikh. She was the elder sister of Guru Nanak Dev, the founder and first Guru (teacher) of Sikhism. Bebe Nanaki was the first to realize her brother's spiritual eminence.
Sri Chand ( ਸ੍ਰੀ ਚੰਦ )(1494–1629) was the first son of Guru Nanak, raised by his sister. Sri Chand was a renunciate yogi. After his father left Sri Chand stayed in Dera Baba Nanak and maintained Guru Nanak's temple. He established the Udasi order who travelled far and wide to spread the Word of Nanak.
Mata Khivi ( ਮਾਤਾ ਖੀਵੀ ) (1506–1582) is the only woman mentioned in the Siri Guru Granth Sahib. She was the wife of Guru Angad, and established the langar system, a free kitchen where all people were served as equals. Only the best possible ingredients were used, and everyone was treated with utmost courtesy. Her hospitality has been emulated over the centuries and has become the first cultural identity of the Sikhs. She helped her husband to establish the infant Sikh community on a stronger footing, and is described as good natured, efficient, and beautiful.
Baba Buddha (6 October 1506 – 8 September 1631) was one of the earliest disciples of Guru Nanak. He lived an exemplary life and was called on to perform the ceremony passing the guruship on to five gurus, up to Guru Hargobind. Baba Buddha trained the sixth Guru in martial arts as a young man to prepare him for the challenges of the guruship.
Bhai Gurdas ( ਭਾਈ ਗੁਰਦਾਸ ) (1551–1637) is one of the most eminent literary personalities in the history of the Sikh religion. He was a scholar, poet and the scribe of the Adi Granth. He was an able missionary and an accomplished theologian. Being well versed in Indian religious thought, he was able to elaborate profoundly the tenets of Sikhism.
Mata Gujri (1624–1705) joined the ninth Guru in his long meditation at Baba Bakala before he assumed the guruship. She gave birth to and raised the tenth guru, Guru Gobind Singh. Mata Gujri accompanied her youngest grandsons, Baba Fateh Singh and Baba Zorawar Singh to their martyrdom at Sirhind-Fategarh, and subsequently passed as well.
Mai Bhago (ਮਾਈ ਭਾਗੋ) is one of the most famous women in Sikh history. She is always pictured on horseback wearing a turban with her headscarf gracefully flowing in the wind, courageously leading an army into battle. A staunch Sikh by birth and upbringing, she was distressed to hear in 1705 that some of the Sikhs of her village who had gone to Anandpur to fight for Guru Gobind Singh had deserted him under adverse conditions. She rallied the deserters, persuading them to meet the Guru and apologize to him. She led them back to Guru Gobind Singh in the battlefield at Muktsar (Khidrana) Punjab. She thereafter stayed on with Guru Gobind Singh as one of his bodyguards, in male attire. After Guru Gobind Singh left his body at Nanded in 1708, she retired further south. She settled in Jinvara, where, immersed in meditation, she lived to an old age.
Bhai Mani Singh (1644–1738) was an 18th-century Sikh scholar and martyr. He was a childhood companion of Guru Gobind Singh[1] and took the vows of Sikhism when the Guru inaugurated the Khalsa in March 1699. Soon after that, the Guru sent him to Amritsar to take charge of the Harmandar, which had been without a custodian since 1696. He took control and steered the course of Sikh destiny at a critical stage in Sikh history. The nature of his death in which he was dismembered joint by joint has become a part of the daily Sikh Ardas (prayer).
Maharaja Ranjit Singh (1780–1839) was the leader of the Sikh Empire which ruled the northwest Indian subcontinent in the early half of the 19th century. Ranjit Singh's reign introduced reforms, modernization, investment into infrastructure, and general prosperity. His government and army included Sikhs, Hindus, Muslims and Europeans. Ranjit Singh's legacy includes a period of Sikh cultural and artistic renaissance, including the rebuilding of the Harimandir Sahib in Amritsar as well as other major gurudwaras, including Takht Sri Patna Sahib, Bihar and Hazur Sahib Nanded, Maharashtra under his sponsorship. He was popularly known as Sher-i-Punjab, or "Lion of Punjab".
Bhagat Puran Singh ( ਭਗਤ ਪੁਰਨ ਸਿੰਘ )(1904–1992) was a great visionary, an accomplished environmentalist and a symbol of selfless service to humanity. He was the founder of the All India Pingalwara charitable society which imparts service to the poor, downtrodden, the dying, and the mentally and physically handicapped people.

Martyrs
 Guru Arjun Dev was the first of two Guru's martyred in Sikh faith and fifth of the ten total Sikh Gurus
 Guru Tegh Bahadur was the second of two Guru's martyred in Sikh faith and ninth of the ten total Sikh Gurus]]
 Bhai Dayala also known as Bhai Dyal Das was an early martyr in Sikhism. He was martyred in Delhi. 1675 along with his Sikh companions Bhai Mati Das and Bhai Sati Das and the ninth Guru Tegh Bahadur ji.
 Bhai Mati Das was an early martyr in Sikhism. He was martyred in Delhi in 1675 along with his younger brother Bhai Sati Das and companion Bhai Dayala and the ninth Guru Tegh Bahadur ji,
 Bhai Sati Das was an early martyr in Sikhism. He was martyred in Delhi in 1675 along with his elder brother Bhai Mati Das and companion Bhai Dayala and the ninth Guru Tegh Bahadur ji
 Baba Ajit Singh ji was the eldest son of Guru Gobind Singh Ji.He was martyred in battle during second battle of chamkaur along with his younger brother Jujhar Singh Ji,
 Baba Jujhar Singh Ji was the second son of Guru Gobind Singh ji. He was martyred in battle during second battle of chamkaur along with his elder brother Baba Ajit Singh ji
 Baba Zorawar Singh was the third son of Guru Gobind Singh Ji.He and his younger brother Baba Fateh Singh are among the most hallowed martyr in Sikhism.
 Baba Fateh Singh was the fourth and youngest son of Guru Gobind Singh He and his elder brother Baba Zorawar Singh are among the most hallowed martyrs in Sikhism
 Banda Singh Bahadur was a Sikh warrier and a commander of Khalsa army. He was among the most hallowed martyrs in Sikhism. Baba Banda Singh Bahadur was executed at Delhi in 9 June 1716
 Baba Deep Singh is revered among Sikh as one the of most hallowed martyrs in Sikhism
 Bhai Mani Singh was a one of the most hallowed martyrs in Sikhism. Bhai Mani Singh was executet in Nakhaas chowk in Lahore in December 1738 ca.the Nakhaas chowk since known as Shaheed Ganj-The place of Martyrdom
 Bhai Taru Singh was a prominent Sikh martyr known for sacrificing his life, in the name of protecting Sikh values, by having had his head scalped rather than Cutting his hair and converting to Islam.
Kartar Singh Sarabha was an Indian revolutionary
 Bhagat Singh Lahore 1931
 Udham Singh Barnsbury, England, 1940
 Fauja Singh Amritsar, 1979

Other Religious Figures
 Bhai Kanhaiya
 Bhai Daya Singh
 Bhai Dharam Singh
 Bhai Himmat Singh
 Bhai Mohkam Singh
 Bhai Sahib Singh
 Bhai Nand Lal
 Randhir Singh
 Babaji Singh

Gurbani Keertan

 Bhai Nirmal Singh Khalsa – Performer of Sikh Keertan at Harimandir Sahib
 Singh Kaur – Composer and performer of Sikh Keertan and New-age music
 Snatam Kaur – Performer of Sikh Keertan and New-age music

See also 

 List of British Sikhs
 List of Canadian Sikhs

References

Lists of people by religion
Sikhism-related lists
List